

The Duruble Edelweiss is a light utility aircraft designed in France in the early 1960s and marketed for homebuilding. It is a low-wing cantilever monoplane with retractable tricycle undercarriage and all-metal construction. The aircraft was designed for a load factor of 9. Two- and four-seat versions were designed. The aircraft's creator, Roland Duruble flew the first example, a two-seater designated RD-02 in 1962, and in 1970 began to market plans for a stretched version with a rear bench seat as the RD-03. Over the next 15 years, 56 sets of plans had been sold, and at least nine Edelweisses finished and flown. In the 1980s, Duruble marketed an updated version of his original two-seater as the RD-02A, and sold around seven sets of plans, with at least one aircraft flying by 1985.

Variants
RD-02
RD-02A
Variant designed for homebuilt construction
RD-03A
Two-seat variant with a  Continental O-200 engine.
RD-03B
Variant designed to have either a  Lycoming O-320 or Franklin Sport 4B engine. Utility variant with two seats or a normal variant with 2+2 seating.
RD-03C
Variant with a  Lycoming engine and increased fuel capacity. Utility variant with two-seats or a normal variant with 2+2 seating for four adults.

Specifications (typical RD-03A)

See also

References

Further reading
 
 

1960s French civil utility aircraft
Homebuilt aircraft
Low-wing aircraft
Single-engined tractor aircraft
Edelweiss
Aircraft first flown in 1962